A Mother's Duty (1658–1660) is an oil-on-canvas painting by the Dutch painter Pieter de Hooch. It is part of the collection of the Amsterdam Museum, on loan to the Rijksmuseum.

Description
This painting by Hooch showing a woman delousing a child's hair was documented by Hofstede de Groot in 1910, who wrote:71. MOTHER COMBING HER CHILD'S HAIR. Sm. 33, 4, 67; de G. 5. In a homely bedroom sits a woman in profile to the right. She wears a red blouse and blue skirt, and is de-lousing her daughter's hair who kneels before her with her head in her lap. Behind her is an elevated, recessed bed with curtains; a child's chair stands in the right foreground. The door on the left, near which is a little dog, opens into a second room, through the door of which is seen a garden with slender trees. This is one of the finest pictures by De Hooch in Holland. [Compare 74.] Signed on the chair "Pr d' hooch"; canvas on panel, 21 inches by 24 inches. Wrongly attributed to E. Boursse in the 1887 catalogue of the Rijksmuseum ; the signature is absolutely genuine, and is wrongly described as doubtful in the 1905 catalogue.

 Gerard Braamcamp, Amsterdam, July 31, 1771, No. 88 (610 florins, Van der Dussen), (compare also Hoet, ii. 504). 
 J. L. van der Dussen, in Amsterdam, October 31, 1774, No. 7 (750 florins). 
 J. J. de J. J. de Faesch, in Amsterdam, July 3, 1833, No. 20 (3500 florins plus 7 1/2 per cent, bought in; or 2590 florins, Jansen for Moget). 
 Amsterdam, April 24, 1838, No. 18 (3311 florins, Brondgeest). Formerly in the Van der Hoop collection, Amsterdam. 
 Now in the Rijksmuseum at Amsterdam, Van der Hoop bequest; No. 1250 in the 1905 catalogue (formerly No. 685).

Gallery
This painting seems to have been a successful design for De Hooch as there are several variations on the subject of this bedroom and its doorway outside:

References

External links
Interieur met vrouw die een kind luist, ca. 1658-1660 in the RKD

1650s paintings
Paintings in the collection of the Rijksmuseum
Paintings by Pieter de Hooch
Amsterdam Museum
Dogs in art